Reuter or Reutter may refer to the following people:

Reuter
 Christian Reuter (1665 –  1712), writer
 Edzard Reuter (born 1928), former Daimler-Benz manager 
 Émile Reuter (1874–1973), Luxembourgian politician
 Enzio Reuter (1867–1951), entomologist
 Ernst Reuter (1889–1953), mayor of Berlin
 Fritz Reuter (1810–1874), poet
 Gabriele Reuter (1859–1941), writer
 George François Reuter (1805–1872), French botanist
 Irving Jacob Reuter (1885–1972), former president of Oldsmobile, philanthropist
 James B. Reuter (1916–2012), Jesuit priest
 Ludwig von Reuter (1869–1943), admiral
 Manuel Reuter (born 1961), race driver
 Milly Reuter (1904–1976), athlete
 Odo Morannal Reuter (1850–1913), Finnish zoologist and poet
 Otto Sigfrid Reuter (1876–1945), German writer and neopagan organiser
 Paul Reuter (1816–1899), founder of Reuters news agency
 Peter Reuter (born 1944), American criminologist
 Renan Soares Reuter (born 1990), Brazilian footballer
 Stefan Reuter (born 1966), football (soccer) player
 Timothy Reuter (1947–2002), German-British historian 
 Walter Reuter (1906–2005), photographer and resistance fighter
 Willem Reuter or Guglielmo Reuter (c. 1642–1681), Flemish painter

Reutter

 Georg Reutter II, (1708–1772), Austrian composer
 Hermann Reutter (1900–1985), German composer and pianist
 Katherine Reutter (born 1988) is an American short track speed skating athlete.
 Otto Reutter (1870–1931), comedian
 Wilhelm Reutter, founder of Reutter Carosserie-Werke in Stuttgart, now Porsche and Recaro seats

See also 
 Reuter Organ Company
 Reiter (surname)

German-language surnames

German toponymic surnames